The following units and commanders fought in the Carolinas campaign of the American Civil War. The Union order of battle is listed separately. Order of battle compiled from the army organization during the campaign.

Background
The Confederate forces in the Carolinas campaign underwent a reorganization from April 8 to 10, 1865, which is shown below. For the Confederate order of battle previous to this reorganization, see the Bentonville Confederate order of battle.

Military rank abbreviations used
 Gen = General
 LTG = Lieutenant General
 MG = Major General
 BG = Brigadier General
 Col = Colonel
 Ltc = Lieutenant Colonel
 Maj = Major

Army of Tennessee

Gen Joseph E. Johnston
Escort
Holloway's (Alabama) Cavalry Company: Capt E. M. Holloway

Second in command
Gen P.G.T. Beauregard
Escort
 Jeff. Davis Legion (Mississippi), Company A: Lt R. E. Conner

Hardee's Corps
LTG William J. Hardee
Escort and Scouts
 Raum's Cavalry Company (Mississippi): Capt William C. Raum
 Stono Scouts Company (South Carolina): Capt John B.L. Walpole, Lt Paul T. Gervais

Stewart's Corps
LTG Alexander P. Stewart

Lee's Corps
LTG Stephen D. Lee
Escort
 Ragland's Georgia Cavalry Company: Capt George G. Ragland

Unattached units

Cavalry Corps
LTG Wade Hampton
MG Matthew Butler

Wheeler's cavalry contingent
MG Joseph Wheeler
BG William W. Allen
Escort
 1st Alabama Cavalry, Company G: Lt James M. Smith
Scout company
 Shannon's Special Scouts: Maj Alexander M.Shannon
 Engineer Troop: Lt L.C. Anderson

Other

Notes

Sources
 Bradley, Mark L. This Astounding Close: The Road to Bennett Place. Chapel Hill, North Carolina: University of North Carolina Press, 2000. 
 U.S. War Department, The War of the Rebellion: a Compilation of the Official Records of the Union and Confederate Armies. Washington, DC: U.S. Government Printing Office, 1880–1901.

American Civil War orders of battle